Gelbart is a surname. Notable people with the surname include:

 Abe Gelbart (1911–1994), Israeli-American mathematician
  (1878–1948), German composer 
 Larry Gelbart (1928–2009), American comedy writer
 Mikhl Gelbart (1899–1966), American composer of Yiddish songs
 Stephen Gelbart (born 1946), Israeli-American mathematician